Wolfgang Grzyb (29 July 1940 – 7 October 2004) was a German football player. He spent 12 seasons in the Bundesliga with Eintracht Braunschweig.

Honours
 Bundesliga champion: 1966–67

References

External links
 

1940 births
2004 deaths
German footballers
Eintracht Braunschweig players
Bundesliga players
Association football midfielders